Imre Kemény (born 24 August 1931) is a Hungarian rower. He competed at the 1952 Summer Olympics in Helsinki with the men's coxless four where they were eliminated in the round one repêchage.

References

1931 births
Living people
Hungarian male rowers
Olympic rowers of Hungary
Rowers at the 1952 Summer Olympics
Rowers from Budapest
European Rowing Championships medalists